"Lose My Mind" is the first single released from Jeezy's album, Thug Motivation 103: Hustlerz Ambition. The song features rapper Plies. It was nominated for Best Rap Performance By Duo or Group at the 2011 Grammys. It serves as a bonus track on the deluxe edition of the album. The song was also included on Jeezy's mixtape Trap or Die II.

Music video 
The music video for the song was released on April 25, 2010.

Covers and remixes 
The official remix features Drake and was performed at the 2010 BET Awards. This version features a verse by Drake replacing Plies verse. The second remix features Trae. Rapper B.G. and R&B singer Teairra Mari have freestyled over the instrumental of this song. R&B singer Ciara covered the single for her Basic Instinct mixtape.

Chart performance 
The song made its Hot Shot debut at #35 on the Billboard Hot 100 chart.

Certifications

References 

2010 singles
2010 songs
Def Jam Recordings singles
Plies (rapper) songs
Song recordings produced by Drumma Boy
Songs written by Drumma Boy
Songs written by Plies (rapper)
Songs written by Jeezy
Jeezy songs